Battle of Agordat may refer to:
First Battle of Agordat (1890)
Second Battle of Agordat (1893)
Battle of Agordat (1941)